Aleksandrs Petukhovs (born 1967) is a Latvian screenwriter and film director.

Petukhovs was born in Riga, Latvia.  He studied film at the National Filmschool VGIK in Moscow. He worked as a film critic for the daily newspaper Pravda. In the 1990s he emigrated to Poland and became assistant director of Baranowski, Kieślowski and Polański. His 2004 film The Last Soviet Movie was selected for the European Film Award.

Films
The Last Soviet Movie (2003)
Gagarin's Dead (1991) - a short documentary
Brezhniev's Foot (1990) - short
Stalin's Fist (1989) - short
Che Che Che (1988) - short

External links

1967 births
Living people
Film people from Riga
Latvian film directors
Latvian screenwriters